Charles Mbazira (born 15 May 1958) is a Ugandan sprinter. He competed in the men's 100 metres at the 1984 Summer Olympics.

References

External links
 

1958 births
Living people
Athletes (track and field) at the 1984 Summer Olympics
Ugandan male sprinters
Olympic athletes of Uganda
Place of birth missing (living people)